Hugh Loring Prestwood (born April 2, 1942) is an American Hall of Fame songwriter, whose work is primarily in country music. He was discovered by Judy Collins, who gave him his first hit "Hard Time for Lovers", which was recorded in 1978. Prestwood has written number one songs for Randy Travis" Hard Rock Bottom of Your Heart", which won BMI's Robert J. Burton award for Country Song of the Year. Prestwood’s song, “The Song Remembers When”, recorded by Trisha Yearwood, was picked as the Nashville Songwriters Association’s Song of the Year and also won a Prime Time Emmy for “Outstanding Achievement in Music and Lyrics.

Other artists who have recorded his material include Shenandoah and Alison Krauss ("Ghost in This House"), Highway 101 ("Bing Bang Boom"), Barbara Mandrell ("Where are the Pieces of My Heart"), John Conlee,  Tanya Tucker, Don Williams, The Judds, James Taylor and Jerry Douglas. Michael Johnson has recorded or performed over a dozen Prestwood-penned songs; his recordings That's That, Michael Johnson, and Departure each feature multiple Prestwood songs. Prestwood is also known for his song "Asking Us to Dance," which originally appeared on Kathy Mattea's album Time Passes By.  Jimmy Buffett recorded "Savannah Fare You Well", on his Far Side of the World album.

Three of Prestwood's songs have been nominated for Grammys in the "Best Performance" category:

"Sound of Goodbye" performed by Crystal Gayle.
"Hard Rock Bottom of Your Heart" performed by Randy Travis.
"Ghost in this House" performed by Shenandoah. 
 
In 2006, along with Jimmy Buffett and Jim Weatherly, Prestwood was inducted into the Nashville Songwriters’ Hall of Fame.

For over 20 years he taught Advanced Songwriting at Manhattan’s New School.

Most recently, the English recording artist Rumer released her album, Nashville Tears - The Songs of Hugh Prestwood (2020). All 15 tracks of this album were written by Prestwood.

References

1942 births
Living people
American country songwriters
American male songwriters
musicians from El Paso, Texas
Songwriters from Texas